The Victor Civita Latin American Library (in Portuguese Biblioteca Latino-Americana Victor Civita) is a public library which is part of the Latin America Memorial in the city of São Paulo, Brazil.

See also
 Mário de Andrade Library
 National Library of Brazil
 List of libraries in Brazil

External links
Official site 

Libraries in São Paulo
Central Zone of São Paulo
Libraries established in 1989
1989 establishments in Brazil